Route 8 is a national route of Uruguay. In 1975, it was assigned the name Brigadier General Juan Antonio Lavalleja, a national hero of Uruguay. It connects Montevideo with Aceguá in the northeast.

The distance notation along Route 5 uses the same Kilometre Zero reference as Routes 1, 3, 6, 7, 8, 9 and IB, which is the Pillar of Peace of Plaza de Cagancha in the Centro of Montevideo.

South end
Starting from Tres Cruces in Montevideo, Avenida 8 de Octubre runs in a northeast direction and turns into Camino Maldonado in Flor de Maroñas, at the junction with (and south end of) Route 7. Camino Maldonado continues in a northeast direction and turns into Route 8 in Punta de Rieles, 13 kilometres from Kilometre Zero.

Destinations and junctions

These are the populated places Route 8 passes through, as well as its main junctions with other National Roads.
Montevideo Department
 Km. 17.5 Villa García - Manga Rural, Route 102 Southeast to Carrasco International Airport and West to Ángel S. Adami Airport.
Canelones Department
Km. 29 Route 101 Southwest to Carrasco International Airport.
Km. 31 Pando
Km. 39 Empalme Olmos, Route 82 Northwest to Route 7 & Route 34 South to Ruta Interbalnearia near Salinas.
Km. 46 Route 11 South to Atlántida & Northwest to San José de Mayo.
Km. 66 Route 9 East to Pan de Azúcar, Rocha and Chuy.
Km. 69 Route 80 North to Migues
Lavalleja Department
Km. 80 Solís de Mataojo
Km. 91 Route 81 West to Montes & East to Route 60.
Km. 109.5 Parque Salus
Km. 116.5 Route 12 South to Route 9 & Punta Ballena.
Km. 118 Minas
Km. 143 Villa Serrana
Km. 150 Route 13 Northeast to Aiguá & Route 16 (near the Laguna Negra).
Km. 181 Mariscala
Km. 215 Pirarajá, Route 58 West to Route 40
Km. 237 Route 14 merges from the West (Mercedes, Trinidad, Durazno, Sarandí del Yí and Zapicán.
Km. 254 José Pedro Varela and Route 14 splits East to Lascano and La Coronilla.
Treinta y Tres Department
Km. 284/285 Treinta y Tres, Route 98 Northwest to Route 7 & Route 17 East to La Charqueada
Cerro Largo Department
Km. 395 Melo, Route 7 Southeast and Route 26 West and Northwest.
Km. 445 Isidoro Noblía
Km. 455 Aceguá & Route BR-153 of Brazil

See also
 BR-153 (Brazil)

References

External links
Viajando Por Uruguay, Rutas del Uruguay. Hoy; Ruta 8

Roads in Uruguay